HMS Resource was a fleet repair ship of the Royal Navy. She was built by Vickers-Armstrongs and launched in 1928. The ship served in two theatres during the Second World War.

She was armed with four 4" guns. Her complement varied throughout her career, from a peacetime complement of 581, rising in wartime. She displaced 12,300 tons.

She served in the Mediterranean from 1939 until 1944, except in early 1940 when she spent a small amount of time at Freetown. She served in the Eastern Fleet from 1944, and was scrapped at Inverkeithing in February 1954.

Resource was given the nickname "Remorse" by her crew, with Don H. Kennedy commenting that "the repair ship Resource became the despair ship Remorse".

References

</ref>

Auxiliary ships of the Royal Navy
1928 ships
Ships built in Barrow-in-Furness
World War II auxiliary ships of the United Kingdom
Fleet auxiliaries of the United Kingdom